Contract is a 2012 Ghanaian film produced by Yvonne Okoro and directed by Shirley Frimpong-Manso, starring Hlomla Dandala, Joseph Benjamin and Yvonne Okoro. It received six nominations at the 9th Africa Movie Academy Awards including: Best Director, Achievement In Screenplay, Best Actor In A Leading Role and Best Actress In A Leading Role.

Cast
Hlomla Dandala as  Peter Puplampo
Joseph Benjamin as 
Yvonne Okoro    as Abena Boateng

Reception
360nobs rated the movie 6.5 out of 10, and commented that the movie is exciting.

References

External links

2012 films
English-language Ghanaian films
English-language Nigerian films
Nigerian comedy films
2012 romantic comedy films
Films directed by Shirley Frimpong-Manso
AMVCA Best Overall Film winners
Ghanaian comedy films
2010s English-language films